Mugambwa "Mogge" Sseruwagi (born 17 May 1978, in Kenya) is a Kenyan-Swedish actor/musician/presenter. He had a role in the soap opera Tre Kronor. As an artist he is known as Masayah and has released two records. In 2006 he became a presenter in the Swedish version of Pop Idol, Idol 2006. In January 2007 Sseruwagi was appointed "Best dressed man" by the Swedish Elle magazine. In the summer of that year he led radio show Sommartoppen with Ayesha Quraishi.

References

External links

 
 

1978 births
Living people
Swedish male actors
Swedish male musicians
Swedish television personalities
Swedish people of Kenyan descent